Mark Taylor (born 27 February 1973) is a former Wales national rugby union team player who played at centre. He is a former captain of Wales and was the first person to score a try at the newly built Millennium Stadium against South Africa in 1999. He signed for Sale Sharks from Llanelli Scarlets in April 2005 and in 2007 he returned to Wales to play rugby for the Ospreys. In the 2005–2006 season, Taylor started the final as Sale Sharks won their first Premiership title. He retired at the end of the 2007–2008 season.

He works part-time as a Chartered Account for H J Phillips (Peugeot), Llanelli and has done so since 1998. He is married to Nicola, Director of H J Phillips. Mark was previously the Team Manager for the Wales U20s national rugby union squad. Mark finished with the WRU u20's in July 2016 
In August 2016 he became the Scarlets Team Manager

References

External links
Mark Taylor scoring the first try in the Millennium Stadium
Taylor announces retirement
Ospreys profile
Wales profile
Ospreys complete Taylor signing
Taylor to captain Wales on North American tour
Sales Sharks snap up Mark Taylor

1973 births
Living people
Alumni of the University of Southampton
Barbarian F.C. players
Blaenavon RFC players
British & Irish Lions rugby union players from Wales
Llanelli RFC players
Ospreys (rugby union) players
People educated at Abersychan Comprehensive School
Pontypool RFC players
Rugby union centres
Rugby union players from Blaenavon
Sale Sharks players
Scarlets players
Swansea RFC players
Wales international rugby union players
Wales rugby union captains
Welsh rugby union players